KBOI-FM (93.1 MHz) is a commercial radio station located in New Plymouth, Idaho, broadcasting to the Boise area. KBOI-FM airs a news/talk format branded as "News Talk KBOI" and is under ownership of Cumulus Media.

History

Adult contemporary (1990-1991)
In April 1990, former country station Kissin' 93 (KIZN) moved over to 92.3 FM on the former CHR station (previously branded as 92 Kiss FM under the previous call letters KIYS) (where it still exists today). The shift left Boise without a CHR radio station targeting to younger listeners for the next year as the future competitor, KF95 (KFXD-FM) aired Top 40 hits targeting to older listeners and lacked music by artists such as Bell Biv Devoe and Starpoint. In its place came KZMG Magic 93 with an adult contemporary format.

Top 40 (1991-2011)

Magic 93.1 
In 1991, the station became changed to a CHR/Top 40 format as Magic 93.1, rejoining the CHR format targeting to younger listeners in the Boise market, and went head to head with KF95. After a rough initial launch, the station eventually took down heritage rival KF95 to become the dominant AC/AAA station throughout the decade. The station made headlines when popular KFXD jock Evan "The Hitman" (Evan McIntyre) abruptly bailed on his shift and called in to Magic to announce that he was "leaving the towers of Amity Road behind".

Magic's popularity began a steady decline after rival KCIX raided Magic's talent roster, resulting in the loss of several personalities, including PD and morning show host Mike Kasper and co-host Kate McGwire. While KCIX's attempt to take over the Top-40 market fell short, the damage from losing the morning show proved costly. A laundry list of morning show experiments and frequent talent turnover did little to solve the problem.

When KSAS-FM was launched in 2000, the two immediately began a head-to-head match-up, and the two stations see-sawed back and forth in the ratings. In the beginning, KSAS featured talent voicetracked from other markets, while KZMG adopted a live and local approach. However, when KSAS turned to more local stunts and events, KZMG got knocked down to third place as it turned to syndication.

93-1 Hit Music Now
On October 5, 2009, KZMG dropped the heritage "Magic" name and reverted to "93.1 Hit Music Now", but still kept the existing format, Top 40/CHR. The logo and branding was similar to CBS Radio's KAMP-FM (from Los Angeles), WNOW-FM (from New York City), WVMV (from Detroit) and Beasley Broadcasting's KFRH (from Las Vegas). The new imaging also featured shorter DJ interruptions and a playlist adjustment to better compete with KSAS.

Despite the change, the rise of another rival KWYD had changed the dynamics of the Top-40 wars to take on KSAS directly, and it became evident that Boise could not support three Top-40 stations. This, along with corresponding advances in digital music storage technology such as iPods and the Internet essentially doomed KZMG, and talk of a format flip soon intensified.

Sports talk (2011-2021)
After an 18th-place finish in the ratings, the widely rumored change was executed. At 3:00 pm on January 26, 2011, Citadel Broadcasting began simulcasting 1350 KTIK on 93.1, and imaged itself as "93.1 The Ticket". Longtime DJ Matt "MJ" Johnson announced a Super Bowl contest, and played Bye Bye Bye by NSync as the final song on 93.1 Hit Music Now. The new format debuted with Idaho Sports Talk with Jeff Caves and Mike Prater, who interviewed Johnson.

Minor league sports broadcasts such as the Boise Hawks and the Idaho Steelheads would not be heard on the FM frequency; instead it would broadcast either ESPN Radio or Westwood One programming. On February 2, 2011, the call letters changed to KTIK-FM. Citadel merged with Cumulus Media on September 16, 2011.

In late 2012, Cumulus Media announced that it would drop ESPN Radio from 47 of its stations nationwide, including KTIK, and would replace it with the newly launched CBS Sports Radio. The move officially took effect on January 2, 2013.

News/talk (2021-present)
On November 26, 2021, it was announced that the station would drop its simulcast with 1350 AM on January 3, 2022; a new translator, K237HA 95.3 in Nampa, would become the new FM home for KTIK's programming. The 93.1 frequency then changed from KTIK-FM to KBOI-FM, a simulcast of news/talk-formatted KBOI (670 AM).

Previous logo

References

External links
Official website

BOI-FM
News and talk radio stations in the United States
Cumulus Media radio stations
Radio stations established in 1983
1983 establishments in Idaho